Big Thunder National Training Center is a Nordic skiing complex located in Thunder Bay, Ontario, Canada. It was opened in 1963, and closed in 1995. The centerpiece was the Big Thunder Ski Jumping Center, which had K-90 and K-120 hills. The center hosted the FIS Nordic World Ski Championships 1995.

References

Ski stadiums in Canada
Sports venues in Thunder Bay